The mid back unrounded vowel is a type of vowel sound, used in some spoken languages. Although there is no dedicated symbol in the International Phonetic Alphabet that represents the exact mid back unrounded vowel between close-mid  and open-mid  because no language is known to distinguish all three,  is normally used.

Features

Occurrence

See also
 Index of phonetics articles

Notes

References

External links
 

Mid vowels
Back vowels
Unrounded vowels